Out of Range is a 2016 Indian Malayalam-language comedy drama film directed by Johnson V. Devassy. The film stars Vishnu Unnikrishnan, Askar Ali, Sumith Samudra, and Ajayaghosh in the lead roles with Swamty, Nila Raj, and Anjali Aneesh Upasana in supporting roles. It is produced by Suresh Kumar T. under the banner of Malavika Cine Creations. Anish Babu Abbas does the cinematography while Rakesh Kesavan and Lonely Doggy score the music. The screenplay is written by Devassy along with Shafeek Mohammed and Fahad Shan.

Plot

Jerin (Ajayaghosh), at crossroads with his stagnant love life; Subru (Vishnu Unnikrishnan), fed up with his mom's argumentative nature; Sanjay (Sumith Samudra), all against his reckless job schedule; Aashiq (Askar Ali), annoyed with unending family obligations - are four friends with instability in their lives. On one decisive night, the four friends take an unusual oath, to quit using their mobile phones forever. From the next daybreak, the world around them turns upside down. Sacking, break-up, and resentment follows. After the initial chaos, they seem to enjoy the peace, ease, and all the joys.

However, this is just the beginning of another story. A steely resolve for more adventure, more determination, more drama, and more blows. Will they live to tell the tale?

Cast 

 Vishnu Unnikrishnan  -  Subru
 Askar Ali  -  Ashik
 Sumith Samudra  -  Sanjay
 Ajayaghosh – Jerin
 Swathy  - Sharon
 Nila Raj  -  Hazeena
 Anjali Aneesh - Upasana
 Geetha Mathan  - Ummichi
 Jayaraj Celluloid  -  Niyas Ikka
 Sinaj Changanaserry  - Ashaan
 Deepika  -  Amma
 Jaison Panikulangara -  Achan
 Gopan Mangat – Boss
 Prathapan K. S. – Raju Bai

Production
The film began production under the name Holy Shit. The film marks the debut of Askar Ali.

Soundtrack

The film's background score and songs are composed by Rakesh Kesavan and Lonely Doggy. Lyrics for the songs are written by Rakesh Menon, Jose Peter and Lonely Doggy. Sachin Warrier
Lonely Doggy, M.e.l, Vivzy are the principal singers.

References

External links
 
 Out of Range Malayalam Movie Getting Ready || Malayalam Focus - video dailymotion
 Out of Range Malayalam Movie Preview cinema review stills gallery trailer video clips showtimes
 Out of Range

2010s Malayalam-language films